Sleepy Hollow Hall is a historic home located in West Whiteland Township, Chester County, Pennsylvania. It is a two-story, five bay, "L"-shaped Federal style dwelling.  The oldest section dates to 1717 and is a 20 foot by 19 foot section at the end of the ell.  The main section was built between 1810 and 1820.

It was listed on the National Register of Historic Places in 1984.

References

Houses on the National Register of Historic Places in Pennsylvania
Federal architecture in Pennsylvania
Houses completed in 1820
Houses in Chester County, Pennsylvania
National Register of Historic Places in Chester County, Pennsylvania